The End of Suburbia: Oil Depletion and the Collapse of The American Dream is a 2004 documentary film concerning peak oil and its implications for the suburban lifestyle, written and directed by Toronto-based filmmaker Gregory Greene.

Description 

The film is hosted by Canadian broadcaster Barrie Zwicker and features discussions with James Howard Kunstler, Peter Calthorpe, Michael Klare, Richard Heinberg, Matthew Simmons, Michael Ruppert, Julian Darley, Colin Campbell, Kenneth S. Deffeyes, Ali Samsam Bakhtiari and Steve Andrews.

In 2007, Greene released a sequel called Escape from Suburbia.

Cast
Matthew Simmons, as himself
Richard Heinberg, as himself
Michael Ruppert, as himself
James Howard Kunstler, as himself
 Steve Andrews, as himself
Ali Samsam Bakhtiari, as himself
Peter Calthorpe, as himself
Colin Campbell, as speaker
Dick Cheney, as himself (archive footage)
Julian Darley, as himself
Kenneth S. Deffeyes, as himself
Michael Klare, as himself
Barrie Zwicker, as host

See also
Association for the Study of Peak Oil and Gas (ASPO)
The Long Emergency

External links
 Official website
 It's the End of the World as We Know It - film review by the Baltimore Chronicle
 "Running on Empty - The End of Suburbia and the future slums of Irvine" (film review)
 Review Summary - The NY Times

 The End of Suburbia // The chutry experiment, May 2006
Post Carbon Institute
Escape From Suburbia (2007)
Global Oil Watch - Extensive peak oil library
Are We Drunk On Oil?

Canadian documentary films
Documentary films about cities in the United States
English-language Canadian films
Documentary films about peak oil
2004 films
2004 documentary films
Documentary films about urban studies
2000s English-language films
2000s Canadian films